William Charles Griffith (26 December 1880 – 7 May 1949) was an Australian rules footballer who played with Essendon in the Victorian Football League (VFL).

Football
Griffith was a full back but was also used as a rover. He was a rover in Essendon's 1901 premiership side and a fullback in their 1911 and 1912 triumphs.

He captained the club from 1907 until 1909 and twice represented Victoria in interstate football, in 1901 and 1902.

In 1997 he was named on the interchange bench in Essendon's official Team of the Century.

References

External links

Essendon Football Club profile

1880 births
1949 deaths
Australian rules footballers from Melbourne
Australian Rules footballers: place kick exponents
Essendon Football Club players
Essendon Football Club Premiership players
Essendon Association Football Club players
Three-time VFL/AFL Premiership players
People from Flemington, Victoria